Opisthoteuthis bruuni is a species of finned cirrate octopus found along the western coast of South America. Their tissue is almost jelly-like, and they have short, round bodies.

The species was originally described from 16 young specimens collected off Antofagasta, Chile, at 250 to 360 m depth. They were smaller than other known opisthoteuthids, reaching a maximum of  mantle length. Even at this small, immature stage, the octopuses displayed sexual dimorphism (sex differences). The males had some enlarged suckers; three enormous suckers on each arm near the mouth were the most prominent, with a small cluster of enlarged suckers also present near the arm tips. This sort of sexual dimorphism is also found in other opisthoteuthids. Further specimens of O. bruuni have been collected from off Chile and Peru (between 5 and 33 degrees south), over a greater bathymetric range of 250 to 512 m depth. This later research also indicates a larger maximum body size (50 mm mantle length, 206 mm total length).

The species is taken as bycatch in trawl fisheries due to its benthic occurrence, and thus may be threatened, but it is currently a data deficient species in the IUCN Red List of threatened species.

When originally described, the extensively gelatinous body and overall form led to the suggestion that O. bruuni is potentially a mid-water or pelagic species. This would be contrary to other Opisthoteuthis which are benthic. However, later research on O. bruuni seems to suggest a benthic habit as material is routinely collected in bottom trawls.

The species was originally placed in the genus Grimpoteuthis; however, it was placed in Opisthoteuthis after some re-evaluation. The classification of cirrate octopuses is regularly revised as scientists learn more about these deep-sea octopuses. Recent genetic and molecular testing, for example, confirmed O. bruuni as a member of the family Opisthoteuthidae.

The octopus was named for Anton Bruun, a Danish ichthyologist.

References

Octopuses
Molluscs of the Pacific Ocean
Cephalopods of South America
Molluscs described in 1982